Douglas Donnelly (born 7 June 1953) is a Scottish television personality best known for presenting sports coverage.

Career
Donnelly was born in Glasgow, where he began his career with Radio Clyde in the 1970s, presenting the top-rated Mid Morning Show from 1979 until 1992. He also presented a Dougie Donnelly File show on Sunday evenings in 1987 through to 7 August 1988 which reviewed a famous musician/band each week. He was twice voted Scottish Radio Personality of the Year. Towards the end of his time, he mostly presented on Clyde 1 and occasionally presented on Clyde 2.

He joined BBC Scotland's Sports Department in 1978, presenting programmes such as Sportscene Live (which includes events such as the Scottish Cup Final and Scotland internationals), Grandstand from Scotland, Afternoon Sportscene, the network's rugby union coverage, and football World Cups in 1990 and 1998. He presented two series of a TV chat show, Friday Night with Dougie Donnelly directed by Martin Cairns, and was TV Personality of the Year in Scotland in 1982. He left the BBC after the 2010 Scottish Cup Final, his 30th in a row, and is currently (as of 2020 lead commentator on European Tour Productions' worldwide live TV coverage of golf's European Tour on the Golf Channel, travelling to around 20 tournaments a year around the world.

Donnelly was known outside Scotland by his involvement in the BBC's networked output of golf, darts, snooker and bowls. He was the first Scot to present the Grandstand programme on the network, which he did on a regular basis between 1992 and 2002. International exposure also saw Donnelly serve as commentator/presenter for the World's Strongest Man during the 1980s on ITV.

He covered four Commonwealth Games, four Summer Olympic Games and three Winter Olympic Games, where, in the 2002 event at Salt Lake City, he commentated on the British women curlers' Gold victory. He has also hosted quiz shows on radio and TV and has appeared on  The Weakest Link, Ready Steady Cook, Banzai and The Games. In addition, he provided a voice over on the Sky One science entertainment show Brainiac: Science Abuse; solely for the "Brainiac Golf" sketch when a caravan is blown up; detonated by a fuse triggered by a professional golfer's putting stroke.

In February 2016, it was announced that Donnelly would become a columnist for bunkered golf magazine, writing a column in every edition.

He is also an after-dinner speaker and awards host.

Personal life
Donnelly was raised in Rutherglen, educated at the former Hamilton Academy and is a graduate of the University of Strathclyde Law School. He was chairman of the Scottish Institute of Sport  from 2005-2008, and currently chairs the Scottish Commonwealth Games Endowment Fund. He is a fan of Clyde F.C.

For several years he appeared in television adverts for the furniture store Sterling, based in Tillicoultry, near Stirling. He returned to advertising for I&K Motors, and provided voiceovers for their spring 2008 advertising campaign.

See also
 BBC Scotland
 Sportscene
 Sky Sports

References 

Golf writers and broadcasters
1953 births
Living people
People from Rutherglen
Scottish television presenters
BBC sports presenters and reporters
Curling broadcasters
People educated at Hamilton Academy
Alumni of the University of Strathclyde